The Cariboo Hockey League was a senior and intermediate  ice hockey league in the Cariboo District of British Columbia. It operated within the British Columbia Amateur Hockey Association.

History
The Cariboo Hockey League (CarHL) was the major Senior A League in the Cariboo Region of British Columbia for a long time. In 1979, the league merged with other shrinking leagues to form the British Columbia Senior Hockey League. The CarHL came back for one season in 1983-84 before disappearing.

Teams
 100 Mile House Blazers
 Kamloops Cowboys
 Prince George Mohawks
 Quesnel Kangaroos
 Vanderhoof Bears
 Williams Lake Stampeders

References

Defunct ice hockey leagues in British Columbia
1979 disestablishments in British Columbia
Sports leagues disestablished in 1979